Marcus Cooper Walz (born 3 October 1994) is an English-born Spanish sprint canoeist who has competed internationally since the early 2010s. He won the gold medal in the K-1 1000 metres event at the 2016 Summer Olympics in Rio de Janeiro. He won the silver medal in the Men's K-4 500 metres event at the 2020 Summer Olympics in Tokyo with Saúl Craviotto, Carlos Arévalo and Rodrigo Germade. 

Born in Oxford to an English father and a German mother, the family established in Mallorca when Walz was 3 months old.

References

External links

1994 births
Living people
English emigrants to Spain
Spanish male canoeists
Spanish people of German descent
Spanish people of English descent
Olympic canoeists of Spain
Olympic gold medalists for Spain
Olympic silver medalists for Spain
Sportspeople from Mallorca
Olympic medalists in canoeing
ICF Canoe Sprint World Championships medalists in kayak
Canoeists at the 2016 Summer Olympics
Canoeists at the 2020 Summer Olympics
Medalists at the 2016 Summer Olympics
Medalists at the 2020 Summer Olympics
Sportspeople from Oxford
Mediterranean Games gold medalists for Spain
Mediterranean Games medalists in canoeing
Competitors at the 2018 Mediterranean Games
European Games competitors for Spain
Canoeists at the 2019 European Games